The Bake Sale is the critically acclaimed EP by American hip hop duo The Cool Kids.

Track listing 

''' CD bonus tracks

Charts

References 

2008 EPs
The Cool Kids albums
Albums produced by Chuck Inglish
XL Recordings EPs